Muncaster is a civil parish in Cumbria, North West England. The parish includes the village of Ravenglass. In 2011 the parish had a population of 290. The parish touches Bootle, Drigg and Carleton, Eskdale, Irton with Santon, Ulpha and Waberthwaite.

Features 
There are 14 listed buildings in Muncaster.

History 
The name "Muncaster" means 'Mula's/Muli's Roman site', which perhaps refers to the Roman fort Glannoventa at Ravenglass. The surname Muncaster. derives from the place. It was anciently called "Meolceastre". In 1847 the parish contained the townships of Muncaster and Birkby. On 25 March 1886 part of Millom was transferred to the parish.

References

External links 

 Cumbria County History Trust: Muncaster (nb: provisional research only – see Talk page)
 Parish council

Civil parishes in Cumbria
Borough of Copeland